The 1958 Icelandic Basketball Tournament was the 7th season of the top tier men's basketball league in Iceland. The season started on 21 February 1958 and ended on 27 March 1958. ÍKF won its fourth title by posting the best record in the league.

Competition format
The participating teams played each other once for a total of 5 games. The top team won the national championship.

Results

Notes

Regular season

References

External links
Official Icelandic Basketball Federation website

Lea
Úrvalsdeild karla (basketball)